Jakub Puchow (born 13 November 1947) is a Polish diver. He competed at the 1968 Summer Olympics and the 1972 Summer Olympics.

References

1947 births
Living people
Polish male divers
Olympic divers of Poland
Divers at the 1968 Summer Olympics
Divers at the 1972 Summer Olympics
Divers from Warsaw
Medalists at the 1970 Summer Universiade
20th-century Polish people